SCCR may refer to:

 Standing Committee on Copyright and Related Rights at WIPO
 Supreme Council of the Cultural Revolution, an Iranian planning body
 Short circuit current rating, the maximum safe current for a short-circuited electrical component
 Sociedade Cabo-verdiana de Cerveja e Refrigerantes, a brewery in Cape Verde